"Behave" is a song recorded by Swedish singer Benjamin Ingrosso. The song was released in Sweden on 1 October 2018 as the third single from Ingrosso's debut studio album, Identification. "Behave" peaked at number 8 on the Sverigetopplistan. The song was certified gold in Sweden in February 2019.

Music video
A music video to accompany the release of "Behave" was directed by Carl-Johan Listherby and released on 1 October 2018.

Track listings

Charts

Certifications

Release history

References

2018 singles
2018 songs
English-language Swedish songs
Benjamin Ingrosso songs
Swedish pop songs
Songs written by Benjamin Ingrosso
Songs written by Erik Hassle
Songs written by Madison Love